The 1901 Detroit College Tigers football team  was an American football team that represented Detroit College (renamed the University of Detroit in 1911) as an independent during the 1901 college football season. In its second season under head coach John C. Mackey, the team compiled a 3–3 record and outscored its opponents by a combined total of 66 to 58. Four of the team's opponents were high schools, and a fifth game was played against alumni. The only intercollegiate game was an 11–0 victory over Detroit Business University.

Schedule

References

Detroit College Tigers
Detroit Titans football seasons
Detroit College Tigers football
Detroit College Tigers football